John Bulkeley may refer to:

 John Bulkeley (Royal Navy), see HMS Wager (1739)
John Bulkeley (MP), English MP 
John D. Bulkeley, US Admiral